The John Wright Stanly House is a historic home located at New Bern, Craven County, North Carolina.  It was probably designed by John Hawks and built about 1779.  It is a two-story, five bay, central hall plan Georgian style frame dwelling.  It has a hipped roof and roof deck with balustrade. The building housed a public library from 1935 to 1965. It has been moved twice, coming to its present location in 1965, and subsequently restored as part of the Tryon Palace complex.

The house's namesake is former owner John Wright Stanly, a Revolutionary War veteran. It was listed on the National Register of Historic Places in 1970.

References

External links

Georgian architecture in North Carolina
Historic American Buildings Survey in North Carolina
Houses completed in the 18th century
Houses in New Bern, North Carolina
Houses on the National Register of Historic Places in North Carolina
John Hawks buildings in New Bern, North Carolina
National Register of Historic Places in Craven County, North Carolina